Alchemy is a 2005 film written and directed by Evan Oppenheimer and starring Tom Cavanagh and Sarah Chalke. It premiered at the Tribeca Film Festival in 2005. The film did not have a wide release in movie theaters, so its big public premiere was on television, on ABC Family on October 7, 2005.

Premise
A university computer scientist tries to make a woman fall in love with his interactive computer before she succumbs to a well-known lothario professor.

Cast
 Tom Cavanagh as Mal Downey    
 Sarah Chalke as Samantha Rose 
 James Stacy Barbour as Dr. Troy Rollins
 Michael Ian Black as Jerry (voice)
 Illeana Douglas as KJ
 Nadia Dajani as Jane
 Logan Marshall-Green as Martin
 Wil Horneff as Dave
 Celeste Holm as Iris
 Shannon McGinnis as Barbara
 Anna Belknap as Marissa
 Tovah Feldshuh as Senior Editor
 Daphne Rubin-Vega as Belladonna Editor
 Susan Misner as Associate Editor
 Erik Palladino as Groom

References

External links
 
 Movie review at Variety.com, by John Anderson

2005 films
American television films
2000s English-language films